The Massa Candida were 300 early Christian martyrs from Utica who chose death rather than offering incense to Roman Gods, in approximately 253-60 AD.  They were put to death by Galerius Maximus, the governor of the province of Africa. The title "Massa Candida" or "White Mass or Lump" refers to their manner of death.  The Catholic Encyclopedia reports that they were hurled into a pit of burning lime and thus reduced to a mass of white powder.  They are commemorated on August 24.

References

3rd-century Christian martyrs
Year of birth unknown